David Hemmings Happens  is the debut studio folk-pop album by former British boy soprano and actor David Hemmings released in September 1967 on MGM Records, and included 9 songs. Hemmings once sang in his early youth with the English Opera Group before becoming an actor. The album was available in both mono and stereo, catalogue numbers MGM E/SE 4490. David Hemmings Happens was produced by Jim Dickson, arranged by Jimmy Bond and was recorded in Los Angeles, California. Guitarist Roger McGuinn, bassist Chris Hillman both of The Byrds and jazz drummer Ed Thigpen from the Oscar Peterson Trio are the session musicians for the album. The album has several covers: Tim Hardin's "Reason To Believe" and Bill Martin's "After The Rain". The songs "Good King James", "Talkin' LA", and "War's Mystery" were all co-written by David Hemmings.

Reception
The album failed to chart on the Billboard 200. The only single released from the album was written by Gene Clark, "Back Street Mirror", it did not chart on the Billboard Hot 100.

Track listing

Side 1

Side 2

Re-release
David Hemmings Happens was released on Compact Disc in its entirety for the first time on Rev-Ola Records (CD Rev 74) in August 2004.

References

1967 debut albums
David Hemmings albums
MGM Records albums
Rev-Ola Records albums